José Costas Gual (January 19, 1918 – July 9, 2011) was a Spanish amateur astronomer.

Biography 
José Costas Gual founded the group Pro Divulgación Astronómicä (PDA) on September 24, 1936, in the municipality of San Celoni, a province of Barcelona.

All the observations made by José Costas after that date have filled the "Diarios" of the PDA to date, including activities, observations, or thoughts related to astronomy.  They contain more than 72 years of astronomical history, in more than 25 volumes, which are currently in the process of being digitized and published on his official page. 

Costas had a brief but intense relationship with the Spanish astronomer José Comas y Solá, until the death of Comas in December of 1937.

After 1959, Costas dedicated himself to polishing mirrors for small reflecting telescopes, of which more than 3500 were built, an activity which won him great popularity en Spain.

See also
List of astronomers

References

External Links 
 Página oficial de Josep Costas

20th-century Spanish astronomers
1918 births
2011 deaths
Amateur astronomers